The Women's Premiership, also called the RFUW Premiership was the top level of women's rugby union in England until 2017. It was formed in 1990 and was run by the Rugby Football Union for Women. It was superseded in the 2017/18 season by Premier 15s.

History 
Women's rugby in England was initially run by the Women's Rugby Football Union on a British Isles-wide basis. The Women's Premiership was formed in 1990 as the top tier of women's rugby in the British Isles. In 1994, the Rugby Football Union for Women was formed and took over the management of women's rugby in England, including the Women's Premiership, after Scotland, Ireland and Wales left the Women's Rugby Football Union. At the start, most of the teams in the league were University teams. Since the RFUW took over and Professionalism was permitted in 1996, the university teams were gradually replaced by women's clubs associated with professional and semi-professional men's clubs as they were able to give the women's team the funding to be able to compete.

Promotion and relegation in the Women's Premiership is determined by the lowest placed team playing against the winner of the Championship 1 North-South playoff. If the Premiership team wins, there is no promotion and relegation that year. It is noted that promoted teams often fail to win during the regular league season during their first season in the Women's Premiership, including Old Albanians Ladies and Thurrock T-Birds, who were relegated in 2013 after losing to Aylesford Bulls Ladies in the 2013 playoff.

During seasons that precede the Women's Rugby World Cup, promotion and relegation is suspended for that season. In 2014, Thurrock appealed against this ruling to the RFUW, claiming that some Women's Premiership clubs were actively attempting to block promotion and relegation in Women's Rugby World Cup years.

Premier 15s
For the 2017-18 season the RFU Council proposed to create a Super League, the Premier 15s with up to ten teams. The new system to be considered new and distinct from the existing Premiership. It was expected that all 8 teams from the Premiership would apply for the new league, together with several top Championship teams. Seven of the eight Premiership teams were accepted into the Super Rugby competition (Lichfield being excluded), together with Gloucester-Hartpury Women, Firwood Waterloo and Loughborough Students (Lightning).

2013-14 Teams and Locations 
Below is listed the locations of the teams that participate in the 2013-14 Women's Premiership.

Clubs Since 2003 

Dates are the year the season ended.
 Bristol Ladies was called Clifton Ladies RFC until 2008.

Champions

References 

Rugby union
Rugby union leagues in Europe
Rugby union leagues in England
Women's rugby union competitions in England